Lev Vladimirovich Rudnev (– November 19, 1956) was a Soviet architect, and a leading practitioner of Stalinist architecture.

Biography
Rudnev was born to the family of a school teacher in the town of Opochka (other sources state Novgorod). He graduated from the Riga Realschule (now the Riga 1st State Grammar School) and entered the Imperial Academy of Arts in Saint Petersburg (1906). At the Academy he studied painting under Leon Benois and architecture under Ivan Fomin. From 1911 Rudnev was a success in various architectural competitions, and in 1915 he became a certified specialist in the art of architecture.

After the February Revolution Rudnev won the competition for the Monument to the Fighters of the Revolution on the Field of Mars in Petrograd (March 1917). The avant-garde monument there was built according to his design

After the end of the Second World War, Lev Rudnev took active part in reconstructing the ruined cities of Voronezh, Stalingrad, Riga and Moscow. In 1922–1948 Rudnev was a Professor of the Academy of Arts (former Imperial Academy of Arts) in Leningrad; in 1948–1952 he was a professor at the Moscow Institute for Architecture (Moskovskij Arkhitekturny Institut). Rudnev was also a member of Soviet Academy of Architecture.

Rudnev's most remarkable architectural work is the ensemble of the Lomonosov Moscow State University on Sparrow Hills, then known as Lenin Hills (1948–1953, co-designed with S. Chernyshov, P. Abrosimov, A. Khryakov, and engineer V. Nasonov). His Palace of Culture and Science in the centre of Warsaw in Poland (1952–1955) resembles the markedly sculptural style of the MSU ensemble.

Projects

He was the author of many large scale Soviet projects, including:
 M. V. Frunze Military Academy in Moscow (1939)
 Administrative building on Shaposhnikov street (1934–1938)
 Administrative building on Frunze embankment (1938–1955)
 Main building of Moscow State University (1949–1953). This is probably the best known of his buildings, for which he was awarded the Stalin Prize in 1949
 House of the Government of the Azerbaijan Soviet Socialist Republic in Baku (finished in 1952)
 Palace of Culture and Science in Warsaw, Poland (1952–1955)
 Buildings of Latvian Academy of Sciences in Riga (1953–1956)

Gallery

External links 
 
 Architect Lev Rudnev, the Author of the Colossus of MSU 
 Biography and Works 
 Architect of the Main Building of the Moscow University 
 Biography 
 Works 

1885 births
1956 deaths
People from Opochetsky District
Russian architects
Soviet architects